Edith Joan Warwick (13 June 1898 – 4 July 1973) was a croquet and hockey player from England.

Miss Warwick won the Women's Championship five times (1960, 1962, 1965, 1966 and 1968) and represented England in the 1963 MacRobertson Shield tournament.

Miss Warwick represented England at hockey in the 1930s and captained an English side which toured Australia in 1927 and 1934.

References

External links
The Croquet Records site

1898 births
1973 deaths
English croquet players
English female field hockey players